Season 2000–01 was Hibs' second season in the Scottish Premier League, after gaining promotion from the First Division in 1999. 2000–01 proved to be a successful season for Hibs, as they started the season extremely well and eventually finished third, qualifying for the 2001–02 UEFA Cup. The club also had a good Scottish Cup run, reaching the 2001 Scottish Cup Final, but were beaten 3–0 by treble winners Celtic at Hampden Park. The season was also memorable for Hibs fans due to a 6–2 win in an Edinburgh derby against Hearts.

League season
Hibs got off to an excellent start to the league season, winning 11 of their first 14 games. This led to Celtic manager Martin O'Neill describing Hibs as "worthy challengers" for the league in October, after they had beaten defending champions Rangers 1–0 at Easter Road. Rangers manager Dick Advocaat dismissed Hibs' chances, but Hibs responded with a "scintillating display" as they won 6–2 in an Edinburgh derby days later, with Mixu Paatelainen scoring a hat-trick. Celtic eventually ran away with the league championship, but Hibs continued to challenge for second place until a losing run in March effectively ended their chances of finishing above Rangers. Their early season form, however, meant that Hibs finished well clear of the other SPL clubs in third place, qualifying for the following season's UEFA Cup competition.

Results

Final table

Scottish League Cup

As one of the SPL clubs who failed to qualify for European competition, Hibs entered at the second round stage of the competition, in which they defeated Stenhousemuir 2–1. Another 2–1 win, after extra time against Falkirk, sent Hibs through to a quarter-final against Kilmarnock. In that match, Hibs took an early lead through a Russell Latapy goal, but conceded two second half goals to lose 2–1 and exit the competition.

Results

Scottish Cup

Results

Transfers
The only major transfer involving Hibs during the season was the sale of Kenny Miller, Hibs' top goalscorer in the previous season, to Rangers for £2M in total. It was suggested in the media that the fee would be used to finance refurbishments of Easter Road, but the Hibs board denied this and pledged to reinvest in the playing squad. A curious bit of transfer activity involved Didier Agathe, who Hibs signed as a free agent on a short-term contract in the 2000 close season. After a few good performances for Hibs, Agathe was offered the chance to double his salary by Celtic manager Martin O'Neill. This prompted Hibs to sell Agathe to Celtic for the relatively small fee of £50,000, given that the player only had weeks remaining on his contract, and could have signed for Celtic for no transfer fee when it expired.

Players In

Players Out

Loans In

Loans Out

Player stats

During the 2000–01 season, Hibs used 27 different players in competitive games. The table below shows the number of appearances and goals scored by each player. None of the players appeared in every match, but goalkeeper Nick Colgan played in all but one of the league matches and in all eight of the cup ties. Gary Smith and Mathias Jack also appeared in 37 league matches, as Hibs fielded a relatively settled side.

|}

See also
List of Hibernian F.C. seasons

Notes

External links
Hibernian 2000/2001 results and fixtures, Soccerbase

Hibernian F.C. seasons
Hibernian